Bad Saarow Klinikum station is a railway station in the municipality of Bad Saarow in the district Oder-Spree of Brandenburg. It is served by the line .

The station, which is situated near the local hospital, was opened on 24 October 2011.

References

Railway stations in Brandenburg
Buildings and structures in Oder-Spree
Railway stations in Germany opened in 2011